The 2nd constituency of the Haut-Rhin is a French legislative constituency in the Haut-Rhin département.

Description

This constituency in Alsace consists of the small towns and villages to the north and west of Colmar including Munster and Sainte-Marie-aux-Mines. It rises into the foothills of the Vosges Mountains and borders Lorraine to the west.

Traditionally it has been strongly conservative supporting moderate parties of the centre-right and the Gaullist RPR/UMP.

Historic Representation

Election results

2022

 
 
|-
| colspan="8" bgcolor="#E9E9E9"|
|-

2017

 
 
 
 
 
 
|-
| colspan="8" bgcolor="#E9E9E9"|
|-
 
 

 
 
 
 
 Source:

2012
 
 
 
 
 
 
|-
| colspan="8" bgcolor="#E9E9E9"|
|-

2007 results required

2002

|- style="background-color:#E9E9E9;text-align:center;"
! colspan="2" rowspan="2" style="text-align:left;" | Candidate
! rowspan="2" colspan="2" style="text-align:left;" | Party
! colspan="2" | 1st round
! colspan="2" | 2nd round
|- style="background-color:#E9E9E9;text-align:center;"
! width="75" | Votes
! width="30" | %
! width="75" | Votes
! width="30" | %
|-
| style="background-color:" |
| style="text-align:left;" | J. Louis Christ
| style="text-align:left;" | Union for a Presidential Majority
| UMP
| 
| 23.63
| 
| 59.60
|-
| style="background-color:" |
| style="text-align:left;" | Pierre Hussherr
| style="text-align:left;" | Miscellaneous Right
| DVD
| 
| 12.84
| 
| 40.40
|-
| style="background-color:" |
| style="text-align:left;" | Thierry Speitel
| style="text-align:left;" | Miscellaneous Right
| DVD
| 
| 10.55
| colspan="2" style="text-align:left;" |
|-
| style="background-color:" |
| style="text-align:left;" | Christiane Ingold
| style="text-align:left;" | National Front
| FN
| 
| 10.15
| colspan="2" style="text-align:left;" |
|-
| style="background-color:" |
| style="text-align:left;" | Jacques Loëss
| style="text-align:left;" | Radical Party of the Left
| PRG
| 
| 9.66
| colspan="2" style="text-align:left;" |
|-
| style="background-color:" |
| style="text-align:left;" | Guy Daessle
| style="text-align:left;" | Miscellaneous Right
| DVD
| 
| 9.17
| colspan="2" style="text-align:left;" |
|-
| style="background-color:" |
| style="text-align:left;" | Christophe Hartmann
| style="text-align:left;" | The Greens
| LV
| 
| 6.63
| colspan="2" style="text-align:left;" |
|-
| style="background-color:" |
| style="text-align:left;" | Christian Chaton
| style="text-align:left;" | National Republican Movement
| MNR
| 
| 6.50
| colspan="2" style="text-align:left;" |
|-
| style="background-color:" |
| style="text-align:left;" | Bruno Ciofi
| style="text-align:left;" | Republican Pole
| PR
| 
| 2.59
| colspan="2" style="text-align:left;" |
|-
| style="background-color:" |
| style="text-align:left;" | Guy Buecher
| style="text-align:left;" | Communist Party
| PCF
| 
| 1.69
| colspan="2" style="text-align:left;" |
|-
| style="background-color:" |
| style="text-align:left;" | M. Helene Pillet
| style="text-align:left;" | Ecologist
| ECO
| 
| 1.42
| colspan="2" style="text-align:left;" |
|-
| style="background-color:" |
| style="text-align:left;" | Eric Talles
| style="text-align:left;" | Independent
| DIV
| 
| 1.42
| colspan="2" style="text-align:left;" |
|-
| style="background-color:" |
| style="text-align:left;" | Christophe Husser
| style="text-align:left;" | Movement for France
| MPF
| 
| 1.36
| colspan="2" style="text-align:left;" |
|-
| style="background-color:" |
| style="text-align:left;" | Vivette Michea
| style="text-align:left;" | Workers’ Struggle
| LO
| 
| 1.28
| colspan="2" style="text-align:left;" |
|-
| style="background-color:" |
| style="text-align:left;" | Vincent Toscani
| style="text-align:left;" | Miscellaneous Right
| DVD
| 
| 0.56
| colspan="2" style="text-align:left;" |
|-
| style="background-color:" |
| style="text-align:left;" | Dominique Monnot
| style="text-align:left;" | Hunting, Fishing, Nature and Traditions
| CPNT
| 
| 0.55
| colspan="2" style="text-align:left;" |
|-
| colspan="8" style="background-color:#E9E9E9;"|
|- style="font-weight:bold"
| colspan="4" style="text-align:left;" | Total
| 
| 100%
| 
| 100%
|-
| colspan="8" style="background-color:#E9E9E9;"|
|-
| colspan="4" style="text-align:left;" | Registered voters
| 
| style="background-color:#E9E9E9;"|
| 
| style="background-color:#E9E9E9;"|
|-
| colspan="4" style="text-align:left;" | Blank/Void ballots
| 
| 2.91%
| 
| 12.57%
|-
| colspan="4" style="text-align:left;" | Turnout
| 
| 61.61%
| 
| 46.64%
|-
| colspan="4" style="text-align:left;" | Abstentions
| 
| 38.39%
| 
| 53.36%
|-
| colspan="8" style="background-color:#E9E9E9;"|
|- style="font-weight:bold"
| colspan="6" style="text-align:left;" | Result
| colspan="2" style="background-color:" | UMP HOLD
|}

Sources

2